The following is a timeline of the history of the city of Aurora, Colorado, USA.

Prior to 20th century

 1890 - Settlement named "Fletcher."
 1891
 Fletcher incorporated as a town.
 H.M. Miliken becomes mayor.
 1892 - Schoolhouse burns down.
 1893 - Denver-Fletcher trolley begins operating.

20th century

 1902 - Section of town becomes part of Adams County; the other section becomes part of South Arapahoe County.
 1906
 Town Hall built.
 Democrat-News begins publication.
 1907
 Fletcher renamed "Aurora."
 First Presbyterian Church built.
 1908 - Electricity begins operating.
 1918 - US Army General Hospital No. 21 opens.
 1924 - Colfax Avenue becomes part of U.S. Route 40.
 1925
 Aurora Woman's Club formed.
 Hollywood cinema opens.
 1929
 Aurora Public Library established.
 Stapleton Aerodrome begins operating near Aurora.
 1938 - US military Lowry Technical Training Center built.
 1939 - Population: 3,494.
 1942 - US military Buckley Space Force Base built.
 1946
 Fox Theatre in business. 
 City Planning Commission established.
 1949 - City Water Department established.
 1950 - East 70 Drive-In cinema in business.
 1954 - Hoffman Heights becomes part of Aurora.
 1955 – Denver Regional Council of Governments formed.
 1965 - Norma Walker becomes mayor.
 1966 - Arapahoe Junior College opens.
 1971
 Buckingham Square Mall in business.
 Camelot hi-rise offices built.
 1972
 Aurora Advocate Sentinel and Aurora Sun newspapers begin publication.
 Little League baseball team formed.
 1974 - Quincy Reservoir constructed.
 1975 - Aurora Mall in business.
 1979
 Aurora History Museum founded.
 Marketplace Tower I office building constructed.
 1981 - Aurora Genealogical Society founded.
 1982 - Aurora Public Library Central building constructed.
 1984 - Bennett family murders
 1985 - City Historic Preservation Commission established.
 1990 - Population: 222,103.
 1992 - Sister city relationship established with Seongnam, South Korea.
 1993 - December 13: 1993 Aurora, Colorado shooting.
 1994 - US Lowry Air Force Base closes.
 1996
 City website online (approximate date).
 Arabian Horse Association headquartered in Aurora (approximate date).
 1998 - Century cinema in business.

21st century

 2003
 Aurora Municipal Center built.
 Ed Tauer becomes mayor.
 2004 - Population: 298,303.
 2007 - Children's Hospital Colorado opens.
 2009 - Mike Coffman becomes U.S. representative for Colorado's 6th congressional district.
 2010 - Population: 325,078.
 2011
 Steve Hogan becomes mayor.
 Colorado's 6th congressional district remapped.
 2012 - July 20: 2012 Aurora, Colorado shooting.
 2014 - Sister city relationship established with Adama, Ethiopia.
 2017 - May 15: The Republic of El Salvador opens a consulate in Aurora, the city's first.
 2018 - Mayor Steve Hogan dies in office.
 2022 - A shooting at Iglesia Faro De Luz Church in Aurora kills at least one, a woman, and injures two others.

See also
 Aurora history
 National Register of Historic Places listings in Adams County, Colorado
 National Register of Historic Places listings in Arapahoe County, Colorado
 Timeline of Colorado history
 Timelines of other cities in Colorado: Boulder, Colorado Springs, Denver

References

Bibliography

 McFadden. Early Aurora. 1978.

External links

 Items related to Aurora, various dates (via Digital Public Library of America).
 Items related to Aurora, various dates (via U.S. Library of Congress, Prints & Photos division)

Aurora
aurora
Years in Colorado